Krista Lavíčková (December 15, 1917–August 11, 1944) was a Czech secretary who fought against Nazism with the German Resistance group, the European Union. She was arrested on September 3, 1943 and was tried along with her father, Paul Hatschek, at the Volksgerichtshof ("People's Court"). Her father's second wife, Elli Hatschek, was arrested with her father, but was tried at a later date. All were sentenced to death, three of the sixteen members of the European Union who were executed by the Third Reich.

Biographical details 
Lavíčková, née Hatschek, was born in Moravian Ostrava, Czechoslovakia. As an adult, she lived in Prague, where she worked as a secretary. She was involved with the German Resistance group, the European Union, whose members were from various European nations. On September 3, 1943, she was arrested by the Nazis. Tried with her father at the Nazi "People's Court", they were both sentenced to death on March 27, 1944. Before her execution, she was imprisoned at the women's prison on Barnimstrasse, in Berlin. Her father's second wife, Elli Hatschek, was arrested with her father, but was tried separately. She was also sentenced to death, charged with being connected to the European Union and with Wehrkraftzersetzung, a crime which included "undermining the military". Lavíčková's father was executed by fallbeil ("falling axe") on May 15, 1944 at Brandenburg-Görden Prison. Lavíčková was executed at Plötzensee Prison on August 11, 1944. Including Lavíčková, her father and step-mother, there were sixteen members of the European Union executed by the Nazis. The record of her execution states, "The convict, who was calm and composed, was laid on the falling axe apparatus without resistance, whereupon the executioner performed the beheading with the guillotine and then reported that the sentence was carried out. The sentence was carried out in 7 seconds, from leading [the prisoner to the guillotine] to notification of completion." Elli Hatschek was not tried until November 1944. On December 8, 1944, like Lavíčková, she was executed by guillotine at Plötzensee Prison.

Lavíčková was married. Her farewell letter, written before her execution, is addressed to Ilsinko and Friedl.

Footnotes

References 

Executed German Resistance members
People executed by guillotine at Plötzensee Prison
1917 births
1944 deaths
People from Ostrava
Female resistance members of World War II
Executed Czech people
Executed Czech women
Czech people executed by Nazi Germany